Florian Seitz (born 5 August 1982, in Berlin) is a German sprinter who specializes in the 400 metres. He represents OSC Berlin.

He finished fourth with the German 4x400 m relay team at the 2005 European Indoor Championships and the 2006 European Championships. The relay team also competed at the 2005 World Championships without reaching the final.

His personal best time is 45.95 seconds, achieved in July 2006 at the German championships in Ulm.

References

External links 

1982 births
Living people
German male sprinters
Athletes from Berlin